is a Japanese adult visual novel developed and published by Lump of Sugar. It was released on December 17, 2010 for Windows as Lump of Sugar's sixth title. A trial edition was released in October 2010 rated for all ages. The primary focus of the game is the appeal of the four female main characters. The story resolves around the protagonist, Kaito Toubu, a secret agent tasked with infiltrating the demilitarised territory of Morino in an alternate universe Japan.

In April 2011, an official fan book was published by Enterbrain, which contained a Hello, Good-bye four-panel manga titled Lump of Comic: HGB illustrated by Fumitake Moekibara who also provided the illustrations and character designs for the game. In August 2011, a Hello, Good-bye drama CD was produced by Marine Entertainment.

Gameplay

Hello, Good-bye is  romance visual novel in which the player assumes the role of Kaito Toubu. Much of its gameplay is spent on reading the story's narrative and dialogue. The text in the game is accompanied by character sprites, which represent who Kaito is talking to, over background art. Throughout the game, the player encounters CG artwork at certain points in the story, which take the place of the background art and character sprites. Hello, Good-bye follows a branching plot line with multiple endings, and depending on the decisions that the player makes during the game, the plot will progress in alternative directions.

There are four main plot lines that the player will have the chance to experience, one for each of the four heroines: May Yukishiro, Suguri Saotome, Natsume Rindo and Koharu Hiiragi.  Throughout gameplay, the player is given multiple options to choose from, and text progression pauses at these points until a choice is made. Some decisions can lead the game to end prematurely, which offer an alternative ending to the plot. To view all plot lines in their entirety, the player will have to replay the game multiple times and choose different choices to further the plot to an alternate direction. Hello, Good-bye also features an achievement system. Once the player has accomplished all the tasks or completed the routes, they will receive the privilege of having a glossary of terms from the game and their definitions, background CG and music libraries, a sprite viewer and even an additional minigame starring the Lump of Sugar mascot, Azrael. There are scenes with sexual CGs depicting Kaito and a given heroine having sex.

Plot

Setting
This treaty has existed for at least a century and many have decided to worship it. Sister Therese teaches history there.

Main characters

 (drama CD)
Kaito Toubu is the protagonist, and a secret agent undercover whose job is to infiltrate the neutral grounds Morino and gather intelligence for the United provinces of Japan. His training as a soldier enables him to think calmly and rationally about things. He has the ability to see déjà vu's. He is affiliated with The United Provinces of Japan and his related arcana is The Fool.

May Yukishiro is one of the heroines in the story, and the first to be met by Kaito. She is a sweet, kind and sometimes a rather clumsy girl, but tends to be slow at times, this is due to her innocent and caring nature. In the beginning May is willing to help Kaito as much as she can, since she is always kind and helpful, especially to uncivilized people. She is oblivious to many things making her a naive person. May is very calm and reserved most of the time. Taking care of flowers seems to be one of her hobbies, as she is first seen by Kaito looking after lilies blooming on a hill. Her route in the game focuses on unraveling the truth about Kaito. She is affiliated with The United Provinces of Japan and her related arcana is The Empress.

Suguri Saotome is also a heroine in the story, the second heroine met by Kaito. She is best friends with May, and is just as kind and helpful as her, but is more of a tomboy. She is an outgoing, high spirited girl despite her tsundere appearance. In the beginning, she accidentally mistakes Kaito for her childhood friend, and then pulverizes him for it. She is affiliated with The Morino Ceasefire Treaty and her related arcana is The Star.

Natsume Rindo is another one of the heroines in the story, and the third heroine to be met by Kaito. In the beginning of the story, she is a transfer student. At first, she seems to be a serious, and simply put, a very well behaved girl, but she is actually an innocent girl who is easily embarrassed by romance and the like. It is shown that Natsume has an extreme fondness for sweets. She is affiliated with The Federation of Japan and her related arcana is Judgment.

Koharu Hiiragi is the fourth and final heroine in the story. She is a mysterious, small statured girl who insists she is Kaito's imouto (younger sister). Koharu's favorite food is meat. She is affiliated with The Morino Ceasefire Treaty and her related arcana is Wheel of Fortune.

Minor characters

Munenori Iwashimizu is a perverted classmate of Kaito's. He wears glasses and his related arcana is The Magician.

Sister Therese works in a church, and is also a teacher teaching history in a catholic school called Cathedral School and her related arcana is Tempelance.

Shidō is a retired, elderly man who is referred to as 'uncle' by May. He is the foster parent of Kaito.

A woman operator whose real name is unknown.

Development and release

Hello, Good-bye is Lump of Sugar's sixth game. The scenario was written by Tetsujin. Character design and art direction was headed by Fumitake Moekibara. Hello, Good-bye music was composed by Shigenobu Ōkawa and Yūta Yamaguchi. The videos featured in the game were produced by RMG and the animation in the game was produced by Silver Link. A trial edition, rated for all ages, was released by Lump of Sugar in Japan on October 16, 2010. The full, adult game was released on December 17, 2010 for Windows as a limited edition version. The trial and limited edition are fully voiced. Promotional videos were released commercially, with four different versions featuring one of the four heroines in Hello, Good-bye: May, Suguri, Natsume or Koharu.

Related media

Printed media
Enterbrain published a 144-page visual fan book was on April 1, 2011. The fan book contains a terminology dictionary, story and character introductions, interviews, autographs, an illustration gallery, comments from staff, and a short four-panel manga titled Lump of Comic: HGB, which can also be read online. The manga is illustrated by Fumitake Moekibara. The Hello, Good-bye characters are designed to give the appearance of chibis in the comic strips.

Music and audio CDs
Marine Entertainment released a spin-off drama CD titled  on August 12, 2011 written by Lump of Sugar. The drama CD features an episode called "School Festival".

The ending theme  is by Haruka Shimotsuki, with lyrics by Mao Sumita. The opening and ending themes were released on two separate CDs, also containing the instrumental versions of the two songs. Hello, Good-bye contains two insert songs". A two-disc original soundtrack was also produced.

Merchandise
Merchandise has been produced for Hello, Good-bye, including figurines produced by Volks Inc., special stick posters, rough line art books, desktop accessories, Hello, Good-bye school attire cosplay, bed sheets, pillow cases, and booklets regarding the game. There are also collectible Lump of Sugar trading cards that depict the characters from their existing visual novels, including Hello, Good-bye.

Reception
Hello, Good-bye was the sixth best selling visual novel in 2010 on Getchu, and was the number one best selling visual novel of December 2010 sold on Getchu. In January 2011, the ranking lowered to 20th place. Hello, Good-bye was ranked first as the most pre-ordered visual novel game in Japan in November 2010. Getchu.com awarded Hello, Good-bye first place for the visual novel with the best quality movie-making in 2010. Moe Game Award gave Hello, Good-bye silver (second place) for the best visual novel song in 2011, which was "Goodbye Crisis" sung by Masami Okui, losing only to Grisaia no Kajitsu which achieved gold. On Hello, Good-bye official website, a popularity poll was held for the characters. May Yukishiro came in fourth place with 2,092 votes, Natsume Rindo came in third place with 2,179 votes, Suguri Saotome came in second place with 2,306 votes, and Koharu Hiiragi came first place with 2,317 votes, and Koharu then received a special wallpaper as a prize.

References

External links

Official website 
Official drama CD website 

2010 video games
Action video games
Alternate history video games
Bishōjo games
Eroge
Harem anime and manga
Harem video games
Japan-exclusive video games
Manga based on video games
Romance video games
School-themed video games
Silver Link
Video games developed in Japan
Video games set in Japan
Visual novels
Windows games
Windows-only games
Yonkoma
Lump of Sugar games